Ronald Hugh Barker FIEE (19157 October 2015) was an Irish physicist and inventor of Barker code for digital synchronisation. He was a member of the Institution of Engineering and Technology (IET) for 70 years. Born in Dublin, Ireland to English parents, Barker excelled in mathematics, becoming keen on electronics. He is best known for his ground-breaking work on synchronising digital communication systems and framing of received data, using digital codes (see frame slip). These digital codes are known as Barker code. The method was initially researched at SRDE Royal Signals Research Establishment, just after World War II for use in radar, rocket telemetry and digital speech. In 1952, Barker found 7 Barker sequences up to a length of 13 useful for correlation. These sequences are widely used in most data transmissions today. Examples of applications are; radar, mobile phone technology, telemetry, digital speech, ultrasound imaging and testing, GPS and Wi-Fi, etc.

Early career

Barker, is recognised for his invention of Barker code or Barker sequence, a means of checking the synchronisation and framing of received data. This is used in most forms of data transmissions within (and out of) our world today. By using a prearranged pattern of bits (Barker code) the receiver can correctly synchronise the data with a very low probability of error.  Quote "A sequence of binary digits has very little meaning unless the significance of the individual digits is known".

In 1941, Barker joined Standard Telephones and Cables (STC) North Woolwich, England in their thermionic valve department, designing dental X-Ray tubes and equipment. After a bombing raid over Woolwich, Roy cycled back to Heath and Reach where he met his wife to be, Wendy Emily Hunt (1917–1998). Barker resigned from STC, as he felt his work on X-ray tubes was unrelated to the war effort.

He took up a new post as a temporary experimental officer at the Signals Experimental Establishment (SEE), initially on Woolwich Common, but soon moved to Warnham Court (see photo), Horsham, EnglandThere, he assisted with the electronics design of Wireless Set No. 19, a standard wireless set used in many types of armoured vehicles and tanks in World War II. From there, Barker went on to design portable two way radio sets for jungle use.
 
The S.E.E was subsequently renamed Signals Research and Development Establishment (SRDE) and brought within the Ministry of Supply. Staff were moved to Christchurch, Dorset, England, in the summer of 1943. The UK guided weapons program came into being in 1944. The first experimental system was named LOPGAP, acronym of Liquid Oxygen Propelled Guided Anti-aircraft Projectile. This photo shows an aerial at the front of the missile which is all important for telecommunications. Aerial design was of interest to Barker who wrote an article published in the Wireless Engineer in November 1948 p361

 Barker was given responsibility for the telemetry research and equipment. This project had top priority so it was easy to make rapid progress. Initial firings were at Ynyslas in Wales (see) prior to construction of special guided weapons range at the Royal Aerospace Establishment RAE Aberporth, Wales.In 1946 R H Barker read a paper describing his system at an international conference on telemetry at Princeton University,US.

Post-war career
 
At the end of the war, Barker was appointed as a senior scientific officer when he took over speech cryptography. The technique for the encryption of speech was to first encode digitally the speech waveform (in much the same way as was used later for digital recording of music) and to then scramble the stream of binary digits by multiplying it (bit by bit) by a second stream produced synchronously in a pseudorandom number generator. The latter was a special purpose digital computer programmed to produce a pseudorandom sequence. This work brought Barker into contact with a lot of early work associated with computers 
and digital transmission (see US Patent 27000696) Still at SRDE Barker had a team of 12 scientists as the work on applications of digital electronics had been extended to include gunfire control,servo systems and communication by pulse-code modulation(digital speech).

Information about SRDE is held locally at The Red House Museum and Gardens, Christchurch, England. In 1976 the Signals Research and Development Establishment involved in communications research, joined Royal Radar Establishment to form the Royal Signals and Radar Establishment (RSRE). The National Archives (United Kingdom) now hold archived documents from SRDE Christchurch. These may not have been digitised.

Two aspects of his work became well known:
The z-transform method of analysing the behaviour of pulse-code modulation systems
A method known of synchronising digital communication systems using what is now known as a Barker sequence or Barker code. The original paper was entitled "Group Synchronisation of Binary Digital Systems". This method is used in near earth space communications such as the Galileo (satellite navigation), GPS, satellite communications such as Skylaband for The Apollo missions See List of Apollo missions.andBarker code was also used for early deep space exploration telemetry such as Pioneer 10The Oxford Dictionary of Computer Science defines a Barker sequence as: 

In April 1954 Barker gained his PhD by the London University and subsequently was promoted to Senior Principal Scientific Officer, this was the end of his personal research and the beginnings of an administrative career. The new job was Assistant Director to Ministry of Supply headquarters, New Oxford Street, London. The headquarters work was tedious and in 1957 Barker returned to SRDE Christchurch, Dorset, as Superintendent of Research in charge of the site.

In 1959 Barker took a job as Deputy Director of the Central Electricity Research Laboratories (CERL) Leatherhead, Surrey, responsible for day-to-day running of the Laboratories and recruitment needed to increase the scientists from 250 to 600. It was during this period that Barker became more active in the Institution of Electrical Engineers (IEE). He joined as a corporate member in 1945 and was elected Fellow on December 1, 1966, serving on various committees of the Power Division and the Control and Automation Division, becoming Divisional Chairman. in 1971. Barker became a member of the council and served on the important Membership Committee for many years. On 6 March 1962 Barker elected a Fellow of the Institute of Physics and of the Institution of Mechanical Engineers. He served for a time on the Automatic Control committee of the latter.

Barker accepted a Directorship on the main board with the Pullin Group of companies in 1962. One of his first tasks was to assemble a team of scientists for research.The company was involved with sonar equipment for the Royal Navy under detailed supervision of the Admiralty Underwater Weapons Establishment however the company did not have the financial resources for research and innovation on the scale that had been promised. Barker wrote an article regarding a Ball bearing motoras at the time there was conjecture as to how it worked. Perhaps this was something being researched or just for a bit of fun. After the company was taken over by the Rank Organisation in 1964 he became unhappy with the changes made to the way the company was run. He had no say in this and it soon became apparent that the opportunities for any interesting research were not going to be forthcoming and the future looked uninviting.

In 1965, Barker made his last career move to become Deputy Director of the Royal Armament Research Establishment RARDE at Fort Halstead, Kent, at chief experimental officer CEO level. Here, Barker having had line management experience in industry now had a much greater level of responsibility. In 1965, there were 2,500 staff at RARDE and Barker was responsible for half the scientific branches and staff. The research work being undertaken was assessment of non-nuclear weapons systems. Barker retired in May 1979.

Over the years digital technology has advanced significantly but Barker codes remain at the core of digital transmissions. Many scientific papers have been published that have found the use of Barker Code to be one of the best and most efficient means to transmit digital data. Since his original paper was published, no other Barker codes greater than 13 have been found.It has also been proven that no other odd-length Barker codes exist. If there is another code, its length would be too long to be of any use. 
Examples of applications are;
radar,
mobile phone,
telemetry,
ultrasound imaging and testing,

GPS,
Wi-Fi
Many of these technologies use DSSS. This technique incorporates Barker code to improve the received signal quality and improve security.
It is also used in Radio Frequency IDentification RFID. Applications of this are huge, some examples are: pet and livestock tracking, bar code scanners, inventory management, vehicle, parcel, asset and equipment tracking, inventory control, cargo and supply chain logistics.. It is also used extensively for Intelligent Transport Systems (ITS) i.e. for vehicle guidance

Personal details

Born in Dublin to English parents his early education years were disrupted by his father's frequent periods of unemployment and moves between Dublin and England to find work as a stained glass window artist often staying in grim lodgings. For much of the time, Roy (as he was known) lived with his mother, a school teacher in Thomas Street, Heath and Reach. At age 13, Barker was interviewed by the headmaster, Mr F Fairbrother, of a new school, The Cedars (now Cedars Upper School), Leighton Buzzard. After an entrance examination he was duly admitted to the school where he stayed until 1934. In the VIth form his main subjects were chemistry, physics and mathematics. It was whilst at The Cedars that Barker took an interest in things electrical and radio, building three valve radios with home made components such as coils and loudspeakers. Barker excelled at mathematics and won a scholarship to University College Hull. In 1938 he gained a 1st Class Honours degree in physics awarded by University of London.

In 1943, Barker married Wendy Hunt at The Church of St Augustine in South Croydon and had two sons. In retirement Roy belonged to three bridge clubs, playing duplicate bridge at county level and was still playing at his local bridge club in Verwooduntil his 99th birthday. Barker passed away on 7 October 2015.

References 

1915 births
2015 deaths
English physicists
Scientists from Dublin (city)
British telecommunications engineers